KDMG (103.1 FM "Big Country 103.1") is a radio station that broadcasts a country music format. It serves the Burlington, Iowa area. The station is owned by Pritchard Broadcasting.

On-air personalities
"The David Kroll Radio Show" hosted by David Kroll is on weekday mornings 6–10. Aric Bremer hosts afternoons Monday–Friday from 3 to 7 and Saturday 10am – 3pm. Kara hosts middays on Sunday from 10am to 3pm. KDMG previously carried Southeastern Community College men's basketball, which has the most wins in junior college basketball history, but the SCC broadcasts were moved to sister KHDK beginning with the 2013–2014 season.

Syndicated programming
Big Country syndicates numerous shows.  The Lia Show, Z-MAX Racing Country, Lon Helton's Country Countdown USA, New Music Nashville, and Rick Jackson's Country Classics.

External links
Big Country 103.1 Website
Pritchard Broadcasting Website

DMG
Country radio stations in the United States
Burlington, Iowa
Radio stations established in 1974